Maria Reisenhofer (31 December 1869, Graz – 18 April 1947, Berlin) was an Austrian stage and film actress.

Selected filmography
 Anna Boleyn (1920)
 Christian Wahnschaffe (1920)
 Marie Antoinette, the Love of a King (1922)
 The Girl with the Mask (1922)
 The Love Story of Cesare Ubaldi (1922)
 His Wife, The Unknown (1923)
 Rosenmontag (1924)
 Fire of Love (1925)
 The Love Trap (1925)
 Young Blood (1926)
 The Long Intermission (1927)
 Regine (1927)
 The Serfs (1928)
 Only on the Rhine (1930)
 The Page from the Dalmasse Hotel (1933)
 The Private Life of Louis XIV (1935)
 The Life and Loves of Tschaikovsky (1939)

Bibliography
 Poague, Leland A. The cinema of Ernst Lubitsch. A. S. Barnes, 1978.

External links

1869 births
1947 deaths
Austrian film actresses
Austrian silent film actresses
Austrian stage actresses
Actors from Graz
20th-century Austrian actresses